An air-cushioned landing craft, also called an LCAC (landing craft, air cushioned), is a modern variation on the amphibious landing boat. The majority of these craft are small- to mid-sized multi-purpose hovercraft, also known as "over the beach" ("OTB") craft. This allows troops and material to access more than 70 percent of the world's coastline, while only approximately 15 percent of that coastline is available to conventional boat-type landing craft.  Typical barriers to conventional landing craft are soft sandy beaches, marshes, swampland, and loose surfaces. Air cushion technology has vastly increased the landing capability of the craft, providing greater speed and flexibility over traditional landing craft.

Like the mechanized landing craft, they are usually equipped with mounted machine guns; they also support grenade launchers and heavy weapons.

Types

 Aist-class LCAC (Soviet tank-carrying hovercraft)
 Griffon-GRSE 8000 TD-Class Hovercraft
 Gus class LCAC
 Jinsha II-class LCAC
 Landing Craft Air Cushion (LCAC)
 LCAC(L)
 LSF-II 631
 Ship-to-Shore Connector (LCAC-100 class)
 Tsaplya-class LCAC
 Type 724 LCAC
 Type 726 LCAC
 Solgae-class LCAC
 Zubr-class LCAC

See also
 Engin de débarquement amphibie rapide

References

External links

 http://www.navy.mil/navydata/fact_display.asp?cid=4200&tid=1500&ct=4
 http://www.hazegray.org/features/nato/us/lcac/
 http://www.globalsecurity.org/military/systems/ship/lcac-specs.htm
 https://fas.org/man/dod-101/sys/ship/lcac.htm

Military hovercraft
Landing craft